Baalah, properly Baʿalah ("Mistress" in the Northwest Semitic languages), is the feminine form of Baʿal ("Lord") and was applied to various Levantine goddesses.

It was also the name of several places in ancient Palestine:

 Another name of Kirjath-jearim
 A city in Negev given to Simeon, also romanized as Bilhah (1 Chr. 4:29) and Balah (Josh. 19:3)
 A mount in Judah, between Jabneel and Shikkeron; maybe today's Mughar

See also
 Baal
 Ba‘alat Gebal ("Lady of Byblos")

Baal